The Council of Fashion Designers of America, Inc. (CFDA), founded in 1962 by publicist Eleanor Lambert, and headquartered in Manhattan, is a not-for-profit trade association comprising a membership of over 450 American fashion and accessory designers. The organization promotes American designers in the global economy.

In addition to hosting the annual CFDA Fashion Awards, the organization develops future American design talent through scholarships and resources in high schools, colleges, and postgraduate schools. The CFDA also provides funding and business opportunities for working designers. Through the CFDA Foundation, the organization supports charitable causes.

History
The first president of the CFDA was Sydney Wragge (from 1962 until 1965). Steven Kolb is the CEO since 2006. As of January 2023, Thom Browne is the group's chairman; he follows Tom Ford who served as chairman for three years.  Additionally,  Diane von Furstenberg served as chairman for 13 years from 2006 until
2019.

The following people were founding members of the CFDA, from 1962:

CFDA Fashion Awards
The CFDA Fashion Awards was founded in 1980 with the first awards in 1981 and honors excellence in fashion design. The CFDA Fashion Awards is an organized event created by the Council of Fashion Designers of America. They honor and showcase the excellence in fashion design in America. It has been called "the Oscars of fashion". Prior to the establishment of the CFDA Awards, the Coty Awards filled a similar role until they ended in 1985, with the final Coty Awards given in September 1984. In 1997, the CFDA Awards made a decision to open its doors to younger and upcoming designers.

Nominations are submitted by the Fashion Guild, a group of over 1,500 CFDA members including fashion editors, retailers, and stylists. Award winners are determined by vote and announced at an annual black tie event held at Lincoln Center, in Manhattan. Award winners receive a trophy made by the New York firm Society Awards.

For the 2022 edition Amazon Fashion sponsored the event.

Collaborations
In 2010, the CFDA/Vogue Fashion Fund finalists Monique Péan, Patrik Ervell, and Sophie Theallet teamed up with Gap Inc. In 2012 and 2013 the CFDA/Vogue Fashion Fund winners and runners-up each created capsule collections with J. Crew.

In celebration of the organization's 50th Anniversary, Target and Neiman Marcus partnered with 24 CFDA members to create a special holiday collection that was available at both retailers. Additionally, the CFDA has partnered with Kohl's on designer collaborations such as Derek Lam for Kohl's and most recently, Catherine Malandrino for Kohl's.

On October 3, 2013, the CFDA and Google+ launched an innovative shopping tool, titled "Shoppable Hangouts", where users had the ability to shop Hangouts on Air (HOA). The CFDA kicked off the product launch with CFDA President Diane von Fürstenberg. Rachel Zoe, Marcus Wainwright and David Neville of rag & bone, and Rebecca Minkoff also participated in the Shoppable Hangout experience.

Programs

CFDA/Vogue Fashion Fund
The CFDA and Vogue Magazine have created an endowment for the stated purpose of funding significant financial awards to one or more designers and provide business mentoring. Awarded recipients are selected by a committee of industry experts.
 
The CFDA/Vogue Fashion Fund Selection Committee annually selects three emerging fashion designers, who receive:

 Business mentoring from an established team of fashion industry professionals, in areas such as business planning, marketing, sourcing, production, exporting etc.
 To encourage and enable the recipients to pursue his/her own independent design plan (one winner at $300,000 and two runners-up at $100,000 each).

2010s Finalists and Winners 
 2014: Paul Andrew (Winner), Wes Gordon, Edie Parker and Simon Miller
 2015: Becca McCharen-Tran of Chromat; Rio Uribe of Gypsy Sport (Winner)
 2017: Chromat: Becca McCharen-Tran (Runner Up), Telfar Clemens (Winner)
 2018: Kerby Jean-Raymond (Winner)
 2019: Abdul Abasi and Greg Rosborough of Abasi Rosborough; Alejandra Alonso Rojas; Victor Barragan of Barragán; Hillary Taymour of Collina Strada,  Danielle Hirsch of Danielle Frankel; Raffaella Hanley of Lou Dallas; Siying Qu and Haoran Li of Private Policy; Reese Cooper; Natalie Ratabesi of Tre by Natalie Ratabesi; and Christopher John Rogers (Winner)

2020s Expansion and Winners 
As of 2021, all 10 designers are to be granted resources including funds and mentorship.  Global editorial director of Vogue and chief content officer of Condé Nast, Anna Wintour, made a public statement noting that “After an incredibly challenging time for all of us in fashion, especially here in New York, we're thrilled that this year we are able to support all of our finalists."  This was to address the challenges the American fashion industry is facing. 

 2021:  Batsheva Hay of Batsheva; Mike Eckhaus and Zoe Latta of Eckhaus Latta; Anifa Mvuemba of Hanifa; Rebecca Henry and Akua Shabaka of House of Aama; Kenneth Nicholson; Jameel Mohammed of Khiry; LaQuan Smith; Abrima Erwiah of Studio 189; Edvin Thompson of Theophilio; and Willy Chavarria

 2022:   Jacques Agbobly of Black Boy Knits; Elena Velez; Felisha Noel of Fe Noel; Lauren Harwell Godfrey of Harwell Godfrey;  Taofeek Abijako of head of State; Conley Averett of Judy Turner; Colm Dillane of Kidsuper; Pia Davis and Autumn Randolph of No Sesso; Omar Salam of Sukeina; and, Jackson Wiederhoeft of Wiederhoeft

CFDA {FASHION INCUBATOR} program
The CFDA {FASHION INCUBATOR} is a business development program designed to support the next generation of fashion designers in New York City. The program provides a creative professional environment with the mission of helping to grow and sustain the businesses of the 10 participating brands over the course of the two-year program. By offering low-cost design studio space, business mentoring, educational seminars, and networking opportunities, the program provides a way for participants to reach their full potential and become an integral part of the New York Fashion community. In 2010, the program partnered with New York University's Stern School of Business to create a Masters Workshop that pairs their top MBA Students with the designers to work on business development projects.

Successful alumni of the Incubator program include Prabal Gurung and the 2013 CFDA/Vogue Fashion Fund winners, Dao-Yi Chow and Maxwell Osborne of Public School.

The 4.0 class (2016-2018) of the {FASHION INCUBATOR} includes Alexandra Alvarez of Alix, Aurora James of Brother Vellies, Charles Youssef, Daniel DuGoff of Ddugoff, Tim Joo and Dan Joo of Haerfest, Jason Alkire and Julie Alkire of Haus Alkire, Ji Oh, Katie deGuzman and Michael Miller of K/ller Collection, Thaddeus O’Neil, and Molly Yestadt of Yestadt Millinery.

Fashion Manufacturing Initiative
The Fashion Manufacturing Initiative (FMI) is an investment fund to help revitalize New York City's garment industry. The program offers matching financial grants to New York City's fashion manufacturing production facilities.

In March 2018, the CFDA and NYCA announced that the following seven production facilities would receive a combined total of $480,000 in the fifth round of FMI grants: Atelier Amelia, Sunrise Studio, In Style USA, Mudo Fashion, New York Embroidery Studio, Season Wash, and Werkstatt.

Fashion Targets Breast Cancer
Fashion Targets Breast Cancer® (FTBC), a charitable initiative of the CFDA/CFDA Foundation, seeks to raise public awareness and funds for the breast cancer cause.

The Fashion Targets Breast Cancer name and symbol were created by Ralph Lauren and subsequently entrusted to the CFDA Foundation.  FTBC was first presented in the U.S. in the spring of 1994 during New York Fashion Week, and was formally launched in September 1994 at a special White House reception hosted by then-First Lady Hillary Clinton. During this initial campaign, 400,000 FTBC shirts were sold, raising $2 million to benefit the Nina Hyde Center for Breast Health at the Lombardi Cancer Center at Georgetown University Medical Center.  This center was chosen as beneficiary at Ralph Lauren's request, in memory of his friend Nina Hyde, the former fashion editor of The Washington Post, who died of breast cancer in 1990.

Since 2011, the council has led an annual campaign to promote the initiative and partners with well known fashion icons. In 2017, Fabletics partnered with Fashion Targets Breast Cancer to produce an activewear collection. A portion of all sales for the collection would be donated to target breast cancer screening and treatment.

To date, nearly $50 million has been granted to breast cancer charities worldwide from FTBC campaigns. CFDA Members have designed special FTBC branded or inspired merchandise, which was either sold or auctioned over the course of the campaign.

CFDA Scholarship Program
The CFDA scholarship program was created to award annual merit-based scholarship grants to students who study in a four-year, full-time college level design program. It has awarded $1,399,250 to students. The Geoffrey Beene Design Scholarship Award, the Liz Claiborne Design Scholarship Award, and the CFDA/Teen Vogue Scholarship Award in partnership with Target selected scholars from one of the CFDA's 20 participating design schools and donated $25,000 towards tuition and educational expenses. The awards are based solely on merit and judged by a panel of industry experts.

Current members 
Notable CFDA Members include:

 Tom Ford
 Gladys Tamez
 Prabal Gurung
 Calvin Klein
 Michael Kors
 Alexander Wang (designer)
 Vera Wang
 Diane von Fürstenberg
 Tommy Hilfiger
 Gabriela Hearst
 Ralph Lauren

Publications 
The CFDA has published the following books, listed in order by publish date:

 American Fashion Home
 American Travel

See also

 New York Fashion Week
 Arab Fashion Council
 British Fashion Council
 Fédération française de la couture
 National Chamber of Italian Fashion
 List of fashion awards

References

External links
 
 2008 CFDA Photo Gallery
 CFDA on The Sche Report

Arts organizations established in 1962
Fashion awards
Fashion organizations
Lifetime achievement awards